The United States Army Nurse Corps (USANC) was formally established by the U.S. Congress in 1901. It is one of the six medical special branches (or "corps") of officers which – along with medical enlisted soldiers – comprise the Army Medical Department (AMEDD). The ANC is the nursing service for the U.S. Army and provides nursing staff in support of the Department of Defense medical plans. The ANC is composed entirely of Registered Nurses (RNs).

Mission

According to the ANC their mission is "To provide responsive, innovative, and evidence-based nursing care integrated on the Army Medicine Team to enhance readiness, preserve life and function, and promote health and wellness for all those entrusted to our care. Preserving the strength of our Nation by providing trusted and highly compassionate care to the most precious members of our military family—each Patient."

Creed
The Army Nursing Team Creed was written by Lt. Col. Leigh McGraw in December 2009:

Qualifications
To qualify for the Army Nurse Corps, an applicant needs a Bachelor of Science in Nursing (BSN) from an accredited program (Active and Reserve). AR 135-100, AR 135-101, AR 601-100, and applicable ANC circulars in the DA Circular 601-FY-X series list qualifications for entry.

The ANC consists entirely of commissioned officers. Nurses who wish to serve as Army Nurses are required to hold an unrestricted Registered Nurse (RN) license prior to receiving a commission.

Leadership
As of 2019, the Chief of the Army Nurse Corps is Brig. Gen. Jack M. Davis.

Specialties – Area of Concentration (AOC)
Public Health Nurse – 66B

Psychiatric-Mental Health Nurse – 66C

Peri-Operative Nurse – 66E

Certified Registered Nurse Anaesthetist (CRNA) – 66F

Obstetrics-Gynaecological Nurse – 66G

Medical-Surgical Nursing – 66H

Generalist Nurse – 66N; this is used to designate positions on organizational documents but is not held by the individual.

Family Nurse Practitioner (FNP) – 66P

Additional Skill Identifiers (ASIs); designate additional areas of expertise or experience and are in addition to a basic nursing specialty.

7T – Clinical Nurse Specialist (CNS)

8A – Critical Care Nurse (ASI to be deleted and converted to the AOC 66S)

8D – Nurse Midwife (Only used in conjunction with AOC 66G)

M5 – Emergency Nurse (ASI to be deleted and converted to the AOC 66T)
Stat
M8 – Psychiatric Nurse Practitioner (Only used in conjunction with AOC 66C)

M9 – Nurse Case Manager

N1 – Aviation Medicine Nurse Practitioner (Only used in conjunction with AOC 66P)

History
The Army Nurse Corps became a permanent corps of the Medical Department under the Army Reorganization Act (31 STat. 753) passed by Congress on 2 February 1901.

Pre-1901
Nurses served in Washington's Army during the Revolutionary War. Although the women who tended the sick and wounded during the Revolutionary War were not nurses as known in the modern sense, they blazed the trail for later generations when, in 1873, civilian hospitals in America began operating recognized schools of nursing.

After the Revolutionary War, Congress drastically reduced the size of the medical service. Patient care was performed by soldiers detailed from the companies. There was no centralized medical direction by a formally organized medical department until the War of 1812. The Army Medical Department was re-established by Congress under the direction of a Surgeon General, Dr. Joseph Lovell. The Army Reorganization Act of 1818 marked the beginning of the modem Medical Department of the United States Army.

Two months after the Civil War began on 12 April 1861, the Secretary of War Simon Cameron appointed Dorothea Lynde Dix as superintendent of women nurses for the Union Army. Some of the women, before reporting for assignment, received a short course in nursing under the direction of Dr. Elizabeth Blackwell, the first woman to receive a medical degree in the United States.

Some of the nurses who worked in the Union hospitals were not on the Army payroll but were sponsored by the United States Sanitary Commission or by volunteer agencies. Their work was largely limited to preparing diets, supervising the distribution of supplies furnished by volunteer groups, and housekeeping details. 

During the 1898 Spanish–American War, the Army hired female civilian nurses to help with the wounded. Dr. Anita Newcomb McGee was appointed Acting Assistant Surgeon in the U.S. Army. After the war ended, McGee pursued the establishment of a permanent nurse corps. She wrote the section of the Army Reorganization Act legislation pertaining to nursing and is now known as the founder of the Army Nurse Corps. In all, more than 1,500 women nurses worked as contract nurses during that 1898 conflict.

Race and sex played central roles. The ANC was for white women only and fought hard to exclude or minimize the number of black women until 1947. They excluded all men until the Korean war when male doctors began to emphasize the need for nurses in the front lines, and this meant male nurses.

1901–1917
Professionalization was a dominant theme during the Progressive Era, because it valued expertise and hierarchy over ad-hoc volunteering in the name of civic duty. The Army Nurse Corps (female) became a permanent corps of the Medical Department under the Army Reorganization Act (31 Stat. 753) on 2 February 1901. Nurses were appointed in the Regular Army for a three-year period, although nurses were not actually commissioned as officers in the Regular Army until forty-six years later-on 16 April 1947. Dita H. Kinney, was officially appointed the first Superintendent of the Corps on 15 March 1901. Kinney served as superintendent until she resigned on 31 July 1909.

The number of nurses on active duty hovered around 100 in the years after the creation of the corps, with the two largest groups serving at the general hospital at the Presidio in San Francisco and at the First Reserve hospital in Manila.

World War I

In World War I (American participation from 1917–18) the military recruited 20,000 registered nurses (all women) for military and navy duty in 58 military hospitals; they helped staff 47 ambulance companies that operated on the Western Front. More than 10,000 served overseas, while 5,400 nurses enrolled in the Army's new School of Nursing. Key decisions were made by Jane Delano, director of the Red Cross Nursing Service, Mary Adelaide Nutting, president of the American Federation of Nurses, and Annie Goodrich, dean of the Army School of Nursing.

Interwar period
Demobilization reduced the two corps to skeleton units designed to be expanded should a new war take place. Eligibility at this time included being female, white, unmarried, volunteer, and a graduate from a civilian nursing school.

In 1920, Army Nurse Corps personnel received officer-equivalent ranks and wore Army rank insignia on their uniforms. However, they did not receive equivalent pay and were not considered part of the US Army.

Flikke remained in the Army after the war. After 12 years at Walter Reed Army hospital in Washington, D.C., she was promoted to captain and became the Assistant Superintendent of Nurses. She succeeded in creating new billets for occupational therapists and dieticians. Flikke became Superintendent, with the rank of Major, in 1938.

World War II

At the start of the war in December 1941, there were fewer than 1,000 nurses in the Army Nurse Corps and 700 in the Navy Nurse Corps. All were women.

Colonel Flikke's small headquarters in 1942, though it contained only 4 officers and 25 civilians, supervised the vast wartime expansion of nurses, in cooperation with the Red Cross. She only took unmarried women age 22–30 who had their RN training from civilian schools. These nurses were commissioned for a term that lasted the duration of the war plus six months, but they were discharged if they married or became pregnant.

Due to the Japanese attack of Pearl Harbour on 7 December 1941, the United States entered the Pacific part of World War II. Along with this military effort was the work of the Flying Tigers in Kunming, China, under Claire Chennault. Nurses were thus needed in China to serve the U.S. Army. These nurses were recruited among the Chinese nurses residing in China, particularly the English-speaking nurses that fled Hong Kong (a British colony) to free China due to the Japanese invasion of Hong Kong on 8 December 1941. The Hong Kong nurses were trained by the Department of Medical Services (directed by Dr. Percy Selwyn Selwyn-Clarke) of the Government of Hong Kong. They took up Nursing positions at the Flying Tigers (Rebecca Chan Chung 鍾陳可慰, Daisy Pui-Ying Chan 陳培英), U.S. Army (Rebecca Chan Chung 鍾陳可慰, Daisy Chan 陳培英, Cynthia Chan 陳靜渝), Chinese Red Cross (Elsie Chin Yuen Seetoo, Irene Yu 余秀芬) and China National Aviation Corporation (Rebecca Chan Chung 鍾陳可慰, Irene Yu 余秀芬). Cynthia Chan 陳靜渝 is the elder sister of Anna Chan 陳香梅 (Mrs. Chennault).

Only a few African American nurses were admitted to the Army Nurse Corps. Mabel Keaton Staupers, who worked for the National Association of Colored Graduate Nurses with help from Eleanor Roosevelt, pressured the Army to admit African American nurses in 1941. The first black nurse admitted to the program was Della H. Raney who was commissioned as a second lieutenant in April 1941. The limit on black nurses was 48 in 1941 and they were mostly segregated from white nurses and soldiers. In 1943, the Army set a limit on black nurses to 160. That same year, the first African American medical unit, the 25th Station Hospital Unit, was deployed overseas to Liberia. Later, nurses were deployed to Burma, where they treated black soldiers. African American nurses also served in China, Australia, New Guinea, the Philippines, England and in the US where they treated prisoners of war. By the end of the war, there were 476 serving in the corps.

On 26 February 1944 Congress passed a bill that granted Army and Navy Nurses actual military rank, approved for the duration of the war plus 6 months.

The Cadet Nurse Corps was created because of a nationwide shortage of nurses. With over 8  million soldiers, sailors, and airmen, the needs were more than double those of World War I. Hundreds of new military hospitals were constructed for the expected flow of casualties. Fearing a massive wave of combat casualties once Japan was invaded in late 1945, President Franklin D. Roosevelt called on Congress early in 1945 for permission to draft nurses. However, with the rapid collapse of Germany early in 1945, and the limitation of the war in the Pacific to a few islands, the draft was not needed and was never enacted.

By the end of the war, the Army and Army Air Forces (AAF) had 54,000 nurses, and the Navy had 11,000—all women. 

Some 217 black nurses served in all-black Army medical units. The AAF was virtually autonomous by 1942 and likewise was its Nurse Corps. Much larger numbers of enlisted men served as medics. These men were in effect practical nurses who handled routine care under the direction of nurse officers. Likewise many enlisted Wacs and Wafs served in military hospitals. Medical advances greatly increased survival rates for the wounded: 96% of the 670,000 wounded soldiers and sailors who made it to a field hospital staffed by nurses and doctors survived their injuries. Amputations were seldom necessary to combat gangrene. Penicillin and sulfa drugs proved highly successful in this regard. Nurses were deeply involved with post-operative recovery procedures, air evacuation, and new techniques in psychiatry and anaesthesia.

Upon Flikke's retirement in 1943, she was succeeded by Florence A. Blanchfield, who successfully promoted new laws in 1947, that established the Army, Navy, and Air Force Nurse Corps on a permanent basis, giving the nurses regular commissions on exactly the same terms as male officers. A month before she retired in 1947, Blanchfield became the first woman to hold a regular Army commission.

Prisoners Of War

Korea
During the Korean War, Army nurses would once again treat the wounded. Nurses would staff MASH units and standard emplaced hospitals in Japan and Korea. Nurses were on the forefront of battlefield medicine during the conflict, playing a major role in the treatment of the wounded U.N. forces within mere minutes or hours of the wounds being inflicted.

In September 1955, President Eisenhower suffered a heart attack while on vacation near Denver. He was hospitalized at Fitzsimons Army Medical Center. During his six weeks of recovery, Ike talked to his Army nurses. He discovered their quarters were substandard, that nurses rotated overseas more often than other soldiers and they were forced to leave the military at age fifty-five. Nurses were also promoted more slowly than other soldiers. Ike directed the corps be led by a brigadier general and that the other issues be corrected.

Vietnam
The Army Nurse Corps stopped being all-female in 1955; that year Edward L.T. Lyon was the first man to receive a commission in the Army Nurse Corps. During the Vietnam War many Army nurses would see deployment to South East Asia. Army nurses would staff all major Army hospitals in the theatre, including Cam Ranh Bay, Da Nang, and Saigon. Vietnam would be the first major deployment of men as nurses into the combat theater, as men could be located in more hazardous locations than what was considered safe for females. Many Army nurses faced enemy fire for the first time due to the unconventional nature of the conflict, and several nurses would die from direct enemy fire. On at least one occasion, the US Army hospital at Cam Ranh Bay was assaulted and severely damaged, with a loss of both patient and staff life.

Currently
Army Nurses are deployed all over the world, participating in humanitarian missions, and supporting the Global War on Terror.

Modern Nurse Corps
The Nurse Corps continues as a significant part of the Army Medical Department. Most training is conducted at Fort Sam Houston, Texas.

Insignia And Badges

The Nurse Corps has a distinctive insignia, a gold color metal caduceus, bearing an 'N' in black enamel.

Superintendents and Chiefs
From its founding in 1901 until after World War II in 1947, the Army Nurse Corps was led by a superintendent. Its nurses had no permanent commissioned rank. The Army-Navy Nurses Act took effect on 16 April 1947, establishing the Army Nurse Corps as a staff corps, with officers holding permanent commissioned ranks from second lieutenant to lieutenant colonel. The corps was to be led by a director holding the rank of colonel while in that position.

List of Superintendents of the Army Nurse Corps

List of Chiefs of the Army Nurse Corps
Source:

Army Nurse Corps officers
 Dorothea Dix – First Superintendent of Army Nurses
 Cornelia Hancock – civilian nurse serving the Union Army during the American Civil War, injured in battle.
 Dr. Mary Edwards Walker – served as a civilian nurse during the American Civil War, became the Army's first female surgeon and Medal of Honor recipient.
 Susie Taylor – first African American Army nurse.
 Clara Maass – contract nurse for the Army during the Spanish–American War, died participating in an army yellow fever study.
 Anita Newcomb McGee – a physician, she became the acting assistant Army surgeon in charge of nursing during the Spanish–American War. Helped to write some of the legislation that eventually created the Army Nurse Corps.
 Anna Maxwell – instrumental in the establishment of the Army Nurse Corps.
 1st Lt. Reba Cameron — career Army nurse, recipient of the Distinguished Service Medal for her work in World War I. 
 Adah Belle Thoms – instrumental in gaining the right of African American nurses to serve in Army Nurse Corps.
 1st Lt. Annie Fox – first woman to receive the Purple Heart for actions during Pearl Harbor. This award was later converted to a Bronze Star when the criteria for the Purple Heart changed.
 Col. Ruby Bradley – one of the most decorated female officers for service in World War II and Korea.
 LT Diane Carlson Evans – Vietnam era nurse, founder of the Vietnam Woman's Memorial Foundation.
 CPT María Inés Ortiz – first nurse to die in combat since Vietnam, killed in Iraq July 2007.
 LT Ruth M. Gardiner - first nurse to die in action during World War II, killed in Alaska July 1943.
 Lt Col Rae Landy - pioneering Hadassah nurse in Palestine, career Army Nurse
 E. Ann Hoefly - served as a nurse in World War II and was later chief of the US Air Force Nurse Corps.

See also
United States Navy Nurse Corps
United States Air Force Nurse Corps
Mobile Army Surgical Hospital (MASH)
Combat Support Hospital (CSH)
Field Hospital
Army nursing (disambiguation)
Vietnam Women's Memorial
Women in Military Service for America Memorial
Charlotte Edith Anderson Monture
National Association of Army Nurses of the Civil War

References

Further reading
 Campbell, D'Ann. Women at War with American: Private Lives in a Patriotic Era. Cambridge, MA: Harvard University Press, 1984.
 Campbell, D'Ann . "Servicewomen of World War II," Armed Forces and Society (Win 1990) 16: 251–270.
 Flikke, Julia. Nurses in action (1943) 239 pages
 Gillett, Mary C. (1981), The Army Medical Department, 1775–1818, Washington, DC: United States Army Center of Military History, United States Army. (Series: Army Historical Series)
 Gillett, Mary C. (1987), The Army Medical Department, 1818–1865, Washington, DC: Center of Military History, United States Army. (Series: Army Historical Series)
 Gillett, Mary C. (1995), The Army Medical Department, 1865–1917, Washington, DC: Center of Military History, United States Army. (Series: Army Historical Series)
 Gillett, Mary C. (2009), The Army Medical Department, 1917–1941, Washington, DC: Center of Military History, United States Army. (Series: Army Historical Series)
 Krueger, David G. (2019), "The Red Cross, the Daughters of the American Revolution, and the Origins of the Army Nurse Corps in the Spanish-American War." Journal of Military History, VOL 83, Issue 2, p. 409-434. 
 Center of Military History, The Army Nurse Corps, Washington, DC: Center of Military History, United States Army.
 Monahan, Evelyn and Rosemary Neidel-Greenlee. And If I Perish: Frontline U.S. Army Nurses in World War II. New York: Knopf, 2003.
 Norman, Elizabeth. We Band of Angels: The Untold Story of American Nurses Trapped on Bataan by the Japanese. New York: Random House, 1999.
 Sarnecky, Mary T. A History of the U.S. Army Nurse Corps (U of Pennsylvania Press, 1999), the standard scholarly history
 Threat, Charissa J. Nursing Civil Rights: Gender and Race in the Army Nurse Corps. Urbana, IL: University of Illinois Press, 2015.
 Tomblin, Barbara Brooks. G.I. Nightingales: The Army Nurse Corps in World War II (2004) 272 pages excerpt and text search
 Vuic, Kara D. Officer, Nurse, Woman: The Army Nurse Corps in the Vietnam War. Baltimore, MD: Johns Hopkins University Press, 2009.

External links

Contemporary unit
U.S. Army Nurse Corps official homepage (on U.S. Army official website).
Army Nurse Corps Info
FM 1, The Army (14 June 2005)
Army Values
The Army Nurse Corps Association

History

American Nurse's Association: Hall of Fame
Army Nurse Corps History
Highlights in the History of the Army Nurse Corps
Army Heritage Foundation Center – Army Nurses of World War One: Service Beyond Expectations
Army Nurse Corps history and WWII women's uniforms in color (WAC, WAVES, ANC, NNC, USMCWR, PHS, SPARS, ARC and WASP)
WW2 U.S. Medical Research Centre
US Army Nurse Corps Collection US Army Heritage and Education Center, Carlisle, Pennsylvania
Viet-Nam Women's Memorial
Women's War Memorial
Aboard the U.S.S. Comfort, 1945; personal account of life on the Comfort, including the kamikaze strike, from last known surviving ARMY nurse, 1st Lt. Doris Gardner (Howard).
 
 
 
 
 

Army medical administrative corps
Nurse Corps
United States Army Nurse
Military nursing
Nursing organizations in the United States